Dallas Robinson (born March 30, 1982) is an  American soldier and bobsledder.

Robinson graduated from Oldham County High School in Buckner Kentucky and Eastern Kentucky University and Campbellsville University. He is known as a sprinter but was also in the USA Rugby 7's and 15's pool of athletes in 2009 and 2010. In 2008 he was ranked 1st in the United States in the 55m Dash and top 10 in both the 60m and 200m races.

Robinson competed in the 2014 Winter Olympics in Sochi, Russia in both two man and four man bobsled finishing 11th and 10th.

References

External links 

Dallas Robinson's Official Website 

1982 births
Living people
Oldham County High School alumni
American male bobsledders
Bobsledders at the 2014 Winter Olympics
Olympic bobsledders of the United States
U.S. Army World Class Athlete Program